Major General Iftikhar Khan Janjua  (died December 9, 1971) of the Pakistan Army is one of the most senior Pakistani officers to have been killed in action. He is known in Pakistan as the hero of Rann of Kutch, as he was a brigadier in command of 6 Brigade, during the fighting in April 1965 prior to the Indo-Pakistani War of 1965. He was killed in a helicopter crash, in Kashmir, during the Battle of Chamb while in command of 23 Infantry Division during the Indo-Pakistan War of 1971. He is one of the only two Generals of Pakistan army to die in combat.

1965 War

In April 1965, as part of a tri-service exercise (Arrow Head), the Indians brought in 31 and 67 Infantry Brigades in area Karim Shahi - Kavda. The IAF and the Indian aircraft carrier , supported by other naval vessels, also moved into the gulf. On 8/9 April, in a series of events not entirely clear, clashes broke out between the Indians and the Pakistanis at a post near Ding, Rann of Kutch.On 23 April Brigadier Iftikhar Janjua ordered the 4 Punjab to capture point 84 by first activity around Chad Bet. Since the progress of 6 Punjab was slow 2 Frontier Force (FF) was directed to join them. By first light, the battalion reached its objective without suffering too many casualties. 2 FF later attacked Biar Bet along with a squadron of 12 Cavalry. Biar Bet was captured by 0600 hours on 26 April.

The outcome of the Rann of Kutch was considered as a positive for the Pakistan Army. As described by Lt General Gul Hassan Khan, then Director of Military Operations, in his later memoirs - "the set back in Kutch proved immeasurably disconcerting to the Indian army. As a result, the Government of India was in a quandary. On the other hand, ours was in a state of euphoria. The high command of our army was intoxicated by our showing and our morale could not possibly have been higher. We were ready for any task that may be assigned to us without any question.". The restraint shown by India would later convince Field Marshal Ayub Khan that the Indian Government was in no mood to fight. This encouraged them into launching the Kashmir offensive, which led to the War in September 1965. After the 65 War, Janjua was the divisional commander of 6 Armoured Division even though he himself was an infantry officer  - no mean feat. He spared himself the time to learn about the nuances of armoured fighting vehicles and their operations.  Soon after, Janjua would command 23 Division based at Jhelum.

1971 War

In the 1971 War, Janjua was divisional commander of 23 Infantry Division. He was assigned the task of capturing Chhamb, a strategically important town in Kashmir, which would turn out to be the only decisive victory for Pakistan on the Kashmir front of 1971. The fighting around Chhamb was fierce and took toll on both the advancing Pakistani troops and the fiercely resisting Indian regiments.
Although Janjua was advised by high command to try to take Chhamb from the south, Janjua said it was a better to take Mandiala bridge his troops would outflank the Indians eventually forcing them out of Chhamb and all the area west of Tawa.

After intense fighting Mandiawala was captured, then Pallanwala and Chak Pandit, and on 9 December 1971, the first Pakistani troops entered the surrounding area around Chhamb under the personal supervision of Janjua.  In the middle of fighting around Chhamb proper, on 9 December 1971, Janjua was killed when his OH-13S (Sioux) light helicopter, in which he was travelling on to coordinate and position his troops, was attacked. Iftikhar Khan Janjua Road is named after him in Rawalpindi, Cannt.

Iftikhar Janjua was a brilliant and charismatic leader who inspired his troops to continue to fight. It was leading from the front for which General Iftikhar Janjua is remembered even today by the troops who served in 23 Division during the Battle of Chhamb. It was this quality which enabled him to arrive at a realistic appraisal of the actual situation without undue reliance on exaggerated reports from lower echelons and successfully take Chhamb.

Personal life

Major General Iftikhar Janjua was known for his boldness and for the confidence he inspired among his men by being in the front lines during the heat of the battle. His father Raja Mehmood Amjad was a barrister and the family was settled in Sargodha District. He is brother of Major General Ijaz Amjad.

Awards and decorations

Foreign Decorations

Further reading
 John H. Gill, An Atlas of the 1971 India - Pakistan War:The Creation of Bangladesh, Near East South Asia (NESA) Center for Strategic Studies, accessed at    July 25, 2006 - pp. 46–47 mention death of Iftikhar Janjua.

Explanatory footnotes

Notes

External links
Pakdef.info Conflict in the Rann of Kutch: A trial of strength by Lt Gen (retd) Kamal Matinuddin
Defence Journal The Battle of Chamb 1971 by Major Agha Humayun Amin

1971 deaths
Punjabi people
Pakistani generals
Recipients of Hilal-i-Jur'at
Pakistani military personnel killed in action
Pakistani Ahmadis
Year of birth missing
St. Anthony's High School, Lahore alumni
Baloch Regiment officers